These are the official results of the Men's Individual Pursuit at the 1980 Summer Olympics in Moscow, Russian SFSR, Soviet Union, held from 22 to 24 July 1980. There were a total number of 14 participants in the Olympic Velodrome.

Results

Qualification

Quarter finals

Semi finals

Finals

References

Cycling at the Summer Olympics – Men's individual pursuit
Track cycling at the 1980 Summer Olympics